This page lists classical pieces in the trombone repertoire, including solo works, concertenti and chamber music of which trombone plays a significant part.

Solo trombone

 Hans Abrahamsen, Kharon (2009)
 Kalevi Aho, Solo XIII (2017)
 Louis Andriessen, Toespraak for Speaking Trombonist (1979)
 Georges Aperghis, Ruinen (1994)
 Malcolm Arnold, Fantasy, Op. 101 (1969)
 Richard Barrett, basalt, (1990-91)
 Leslie Bassett, Suite (1957)
 Luciano Berio, Sequenza V (1966)
 Leonard Bernstein, Elegy for Mippy II (1948)
 Howard J. Buss, A Day in the City (1986), Camel Music (1975), On the Stroke of Midnight (2021)
 John Cage, Solo for Sliding Trombone (1957-1958)
 Elliott Carter, Gra (1994)
 Elliott Carter, Retracing V (2011)
 David Cope, Three Pieces (1966)
 David Cope, B.T.R.B. for Bass Trombonist (1971)
 Peter Maxwell Davies, Judas Mercator (2004)
 David Del Tredici, The Felix Variations for Bass Trombone (2010)
 Franco Donatoni, Scaglie (1992)
 Pascal Dusapin, Indeed (1987)
 Einar Englund, Panorama (1976)
 Luca Francesconi, Respiro (1987)
 Vinko Globokar, Échanges (1973)
 Vinko Globokar, Oblak semen (1996)
 Tom Johnson, Sequenza minimalista (1993)
 Tom Johnson, Tilework (2003)
 Alvin Lucier, Stacks for Trombone, Multimedia and Sculpture (1993)
 Vincent Persichetti, Parable XVIII, Op. 133 (1975)
 Folke Rabe, Basta (1982)  
 Frederic Rzewski, Last Judgement (1969)
 Giacinto Scelsi, Tre pezzi (1957)
 Karlheinz Stockhausen, In Freundschaft, Nr. 4612/13 (1977)
 Karlheinz Stockhausen, Signale zur Invasion,  2. ex Nr. 61 (1992)
 Christian Wolff, Peggy (1993)
 Iannis Xenakis, Keren (1986)

Trombone and piano

 Bert Appermont, Sketches of Spring (2005)
 Bert Appermont, Colors for Trombone (2008)
 Leslie Bassett, Sonata (1954)
 William Bolcom, Trombone Concerto (2016)
 Howard J. Buss, Trombone Concerto (1985),  Trek! (1999), Sonata Lyrique (2020)
 John Cage, Two5 (1991)
 Henry Cowell, Hymn and Fuguing Tune No. 13 (1960)
 Léo Delibes, Morceau à déchiffrer (1887)
 Edison Denisov, Choral Varié (1975)
 Pierre Max Dubois, Histoires de trombone (1978)
 Pierre Max Dubois, Menuet d’automne (1978)
 Pierre Max Dubois, La danse du hérisson (1980)
 Henri Dutilleux, Choral, cadence et fugato (1950)
 Launy Grøndahl, Concerto for Trombone (1924)
 Jennifer Higdon, Legacy, version C (1999)
 Paul Hindemith, Trombone Sonata (1941)
 Vagn Holmboe, Trombone Sonata, Op. 172a (1987)
 Arthur Honegger, Hommage du trombone exprimant la tristesse de l'auteur absent (1925)
 Alan Hovhaness, O World, Op. 32, No. 2 (1960)
 Joseph Jongen, Aria et polonaise, Op.128 (1944)
 Ernst Krenek, 5 Pièces (1967)
 György Kurtág, Six Pieces (1999)
 Alvin Lucier, Panorama (1993)
 Otto Luening' Sonata (1953)
 Frank Martin, Ballade (1940)
 Johan de Meij, Rapsodia Borealis (2001)
 Johan de Meij, Canticles (2007)
 Pauline Oliveros, The Gender of Now: There But Not There (2005)
 Guy Ropartz, Pièce (1908)
 Camille Saint-Saëns, Cavatine, Op.144 (1915)
 Alexander Tcherepnin, Andante, Op. 64 (1939)
 Christian Wolff, Ruth (1991)

Trombone choir

 Bert Appermont, Golden Glow for 4 Trombones (2013)
 Gilbert Amy, Posaunen for 4 Trombones (1987)
 Louis Andriessen, Rage, rage against the dying of the light for 4 Trombones (1966)
 Alexander Arutiunian, Dance for 4 Trombones (1989)
 Leslie Bassett, Quartet for 4 Trombones (1949)
 Leslie Bassett, 12 Duos for 2 or 4 Trombones (1974)
 Leslie Bassett, Three Equale for 4 Trombones (1996)
 Ludwig van Beethoven, Drei Equale für vier Posaunen, WoO 30 for 4 Trombones (1812)
 Anton Bruckner, Two Aequali, WAB 114 & 149 for 3 Trombones (1847)
 Howard J. Buss, Odyssey for 4 Trombones (1987), Levi's Dream for 4 Trombones (2011), Brom Bones for 8 Trombones (2010),  Showdown for 10 Trombones (1987), Prayer for 12 Trombones (2015), Trombone Graffiti for 4 Trombones (2016),
 Michael Daugherty, Steamboat for Trombone Choir (2014)
 Pierre Max Dubois, Cahin-caha for 2 Trombones (1978)
 Pierre Max Dubois, A petits pas for 3 Trombones (1978)
 Pierre Max Dubois, A toute coulisse for 4 Trombones (1978)
 Pierre Max Dubois, Easy sliding for 8 Trombones
 Pascal Dusapin, Sly for 4 Trombones (1987)
 Karlheinz Essl, Faites vos jeux! for 4-8 Trombones (2004)
 Christopher Fox, stone.wind.rain.sun1 for 4 Trombones (1990)
 Vinko Globokar, Discours II for 5 Trombones (1968)
 Gordon Jacob, Octet for 8 Trombones (1981)
 Georg Friedrich Haas, Octet for 8 Trombones (2015)
 Alois Hába, Suite in quarter-tones, Op. 72 for 4 Trombones (1944)
 Luca Lombardi, Proporzioni for 4 Trombones (1969)
 Luca Lombardi, Mirum for 4 Trombones (1984)
 Per Nørgård, Krystaller-Massiver-Kaskader for 12 Trombones (2004)
 Arvo Pärt, Summa for 4 Trombones (2008)
 Rolf Riehm, No Velvet Mute For Lullabies for 4 Trombones (2005)
 Frederic Rzewski, Last Judgement, version for several Trombones (1969)
 Manfred Stahnke, COWS & BELLS for 8 Trombones (1995)
 Charles Wuorinen, Consort of Four Trombones (1960)

Trombone and instrument(s)

 Kalevi Aho, Epilogue for Trombone and Organ (1998)
 Richard Barrett, EARTH for Trombone and Percussionist (1987-88)
 Richard Barrett, Aurora for Quartertone Flugelhorn and Alto Trombone (2005-10)
 Leslie Bassett, Concerto Lirico (1983)
 Harrison Birtwistle, Duet 5, for Horn and Trombone (2014)
 Hayo Boerema, Mutations for Trombone and Organ (2022)
 John Cage, Five3 for Trombone and String Quartet (1991)
 Friedrich Cerha, Quintett for Trombone and String Quartet (2005)
 Friedrich Cerha, Malinconia for Baritone and Trombone (2007)
 Ikuma Dan, Three Letters for Trombone and Harp (1999)
 Iancu Dumitrescu, Nimbus I-III for Trombone(s), Percussion and Tape (1984)
 Peter Maxwell Davies, Aloha Hunter for Trombone and Clarinet (1966)
 David Del Tredici, Dynamic Duo for Bass Trombone and Violin (2013)
 David Del Tredici, David for Bass Trombone and Violin (2015)
 Edward Elgar, Duett for trombone and double bass (1887)
 Karlheinz Essl, exit*glue for Trombone and Electric Guitar (2016)
 Christopher Fox, Hidden Consequences for Microtonal Horn, Trombone and Microtonal Tuba (2009-10)
 Johannes Fritsch, 12'99–01'00 for Trombone and Percussion (2000)
 Beat Furrer, spazio immergente for Soprano and Trombone (2015)
 Gérard Grisey, Solo Pour Deux for Clarinet and Trombone (1981)
 Alois Hába, Suite, Op. 56 for Quarter-tone Trumpet and Trombone (1944)
 Vagn Holmboe, Notater, Op. 140 for 3 Trombones and Tuba (1979)
 Gustav Holst, Duo Concertante for Trombone and Organ (1894)
 Alan Hovhaness, Mysterious Horse Before the Gate, Op. 205 for Trombone and 5 Percussions (1977)
 Jan Koetsier, Partita "Wachet auf, ruft uns die Stimme" for Trombone and Organ, Opus 41/3 (1976)
 Alvin Lucier, Bar Lazy J for Tenor Trombone and Clarinet (2003)
 Johan de Meij, Two-Bone Concerto for 2 Trombones and Piano (2016)
 Octavian Nemescu, Finalpha for Trombone, Percussion and Tape (1990)
 Larry Polansky, Two Children's Songs for Trombone and Tuba (1992)
 Larry Polansky, Three Pieces for Trombone and Tuba (2011)
 Roger Reynolds, ...from behind the unreasoning mask for Trombone, Percussion and Electroacoustic Sound (1974-75)
 R. Murray Schafer, Music for Wilderness Lake for 12 Trombones (1979)
 Ernst Schiffmann, Intermezzo for Trombone and Organ, Opus 53
 Florent Schmitt, Quartet, Op. 109 for 3 Trombones and Tuba (1946)
 Enjott Schneider, Golgatha. Introduction and Chaconne for Trombone and Organ (2010)
 Alfred Schnittke, Schall und Hall for Trombone and Organ (1983)
 Josef Tal, Duo for Trombone and Harp (1989)
 Joan Tower, Elegy for Trombone and String Quartet (1993)
 Christian Wolff, Dark as a Dungeon for Trombone and Double Bass (1977)
 Charles Wuorinen, Archangel for Bass Trombone and String Quartet (1977)
 Charles Wuorinen, Trombone Trio for Trombone, Mallet Instruments and Piano (1985)
 Iannis Xenakis, Zythos for Trombone and 6 Percussionists (1996)

Trombone and ensemble

 Bert Appermont, Colors for Trombone for Trombone and Concert Band (1998)
 Richard Barrett, basalt-E for Trombone, Percussionist and Strings (1990-92)
 William Bolcom, Trombone Concerto for Trombone and Concert Band (2016)
 Steven Bryant, Trombone Concerto for Trombone, Orchestral Winds, and Percussion (2016)
 Friedrich Cerha, Musik for Trombone and Strings (2005)
 Franco Donatoni, Sweet Basil for Trombone and Big Band (1993)
 Peter Eötvös, Paris-Dakar for Trombone, Brass and Percussion (2000)
 Jean Françaix, Concerto pour trombone et 10 instruments à vent (1983)
 Vinko Globokar, Kolo for Trombone, Mixed Choir and Electronics (1988)
 Vinko Globokar, Eppure si muove for Trombone and 11 instruments (2003)
 Launy Grøndahl, Concerto for Trombone, version for Trombone and Concert Band / Brass Band (1924)
 Alan Hovhaness, Symphony No. 34, Op. 310 for Bass Trombone and Strings (1977)
 Alan Hovhaness, Diran (the Religious Singer), Concerto No. 3, Op. 94 for Baritone Trombone and Strings (1948)
 Ladislav Kupkovič, Fleisch des Kreuzes (mäso kriza) for Trombone and 10 Percussions (1962)
 David Lang, men for Amplified Trombone and Ensemble (2001)
 Alvin Lucier, Copied Lines, previously Panorama II for Trombone and Strings (2011)
 John Mackey, Harvest: Concerto for Trombone for Trombone and Wind Ensemble (2009)
 David Maslanka, Trombone Concerto for Trombone and Wind Ensemble (2007)
 Johan de Meij, T-Bone Concerto for Trombone and Wind Orchestra / Brass Band (1996)
 Johan de Meij, Rapsodia Borealis for Trombone and Wind Orchestra (2001)
 Johan de Meij, Canticles for Bass Trombone and Wind Orchestra / Brass Band (2007)
 Darius Milhaud, Concertino d'hiver, Op. 327 for Trombone and String Orchestra (1953)
 Arvo Pärt, Fratres for Trombone, String Orchestra and Percussion (1993)
 Nikolai Rimsky-Korsakov, Concerto for Trombone and Military Band (1877)
 Peter Ruzicka, STILL for Trombone and Ensemble (2016)
 Frederic Rzewski, Moonrise with Memories for Bass Trombone and 6 Instruments (1978)
 Gunther Schuller, Eine Kleine Posaunenmusik for Trombone and Ensemble (1980)
 Marco Stroppa, From Needle's Eye for Trombone, Double Quintet and Percussion (1996-2001)
 Charles Wuorinen, Archaeopteryx for Bass Trombone and 10 Players (1978)
 Ellen Taaffe Zwilich, Concerto for Bass Trombone, Strings, Timpani and Cymbals (1989)

Trombone and orchestra

 Kalevi Aho, Symphony No. 9 (1993-94)
 Kalevi Aho, Trombone Concerto (2010)
 Johann Georg Albrechtsberger, Trombone Concerto in B-flat major (1769)
 Bert Appermont, Colors for Trombone
 Alexander Arutiunian, Concerto for Trombone (1991)
 Luciano Berio, SOLO (1999)
 Ernest Bloch, Symphony for Trombone and Orchestra (1954)
 William Bolcom, Trombone Concerto (2016)
 Carlos Chávez, Concerto for Trombone (1976-77)
 Ferdinand David, Concertino for Trombone, Op. 4 (1837)
 Pascal Dusapin, Watt (1994)
 Rolf Gehlhaar, Lamina! (1977)
 Launy Grøndahl, Concerto for Trombone (1924)
 Georg Friedrich Haas, Trombone Concerto (2016)
 Michael Haydn, Larghetto per il trombone concertato in F major (1763?)
 Michael Haydn, Trombone Concerto in D major (1764)
 Vagn Holmboe, Concerto No. 12, Op. 52 (1950)
 Gordon Jacob, Concerto for Trombone (1956)
 Jouni Kaipainen, 'Life is..., Trombone Concerto, Op.100 (2014)
 James MacMillan, Trombone Concerto (2016)
 Frank Martin, Ballade (1940–41)
 Leopold Mozart, Trombone Concerto from Serenade in G major (1762)
 Michael Nyman, Concerto for Trombone (1995)
 Arvo Pärt, An den Wassern zu Babel saßen wir und weinten for Trombone and Chamber Orchestra (1995)
 Wolfgang Rihm, Canzona per sonare (1952)
 Nino Rota, Concerto per Trombone (1966)
 Christopher Rouse, Trombone Concerto (1991)
 Jan Sandström, Motorcykelkonserten, Trombone Concerto No. 1 (1988-89)
 Jan Sandström, Don Quixote, Trombone Concerto No. 2 (1994)
 Nathaniel Shilkret, Concerto for Trombone (1942)
 Toru Takemitsu, Fantasma/Cantos II (1994)
 Jukka Tiensuu, Suuna, Trombone Concerto (2017)
 Melinda Wagner, Concerto for Trombone (2007)
 Georg Christoph Wagenseil, Trombone Concerto in E-flat major (1755?)
 Iannis Xenakis, Troorkh (1991)
 Takashi Yoshimatsu, Orion Machine, Trombone Concerto (1993)
 Ellen Taaffe Zwilich, Trombone Concerto (1988)

Trombone, soloist(s) and ensemble / orchestra

 Michael Daugherty, Rosa Parks Boulevard for 3 Trombones and Orchestra / Symphonic Band (2014)
 Beat Furrer, spazio immergente III for Soprano, Trombone and Strings (2019)
 Michael Haydn, Concertino in D major for Horn, Trombone and Orchestra (1767)
 Jennifer Higdon, Low Brass Concerto for 2 Tenor Trombones, Bass Trombone, Tuba and Orchestra (2017)
 Helmut Lachenmann, NUN for Flute, Trombone, Male Choir and Orchestra (1999)
 Johan de Meij, Two-Bone Concerto for 2 Trombones and Wind Orchestra / Brass Band (2016)
 Leopold Mozart, Serenade for Trumpet, Trombone and Orchestra (1762)
 Pauline Oliveros, The Heart of Tones - Mixed realities for Trombones, Voices & Ensemble in Mixed Reality (2008)
 Arvo Pärt, Pari intervallo for Clarinet, Trombone and String Orchestra (1976)
 Toru Takemitsu, Gémeaux for Oboe, Trombone and 2 Orchestras (1971-86)
 Georg Christoph Wagenseil, Memoriam from Confitebor for Trombone, Alto and Orchestra  (1760?)

Electronic / Electroacoustic

 Barry Anderson, Sound The Tucket Sonance And The Note To Mount for Trombone and Tape (1980)
 Richard Barrett, mask for Trombone and Optional Electronics (2017-18)
 Richard Barrett, membrane for Trombone and Electronics (2017-19)
 Howard J. Buss, Alien Loop de Loops for Trombone or Bass trombone and electronic recording (2015)
 Karlheinz Essl, Si! for Trombone, Live Electronics and Surround Sound (2012)
 Christopher Fox, Recirculation for Bass Trombone and Tape (1981-82)
 Christopher Fox, stone.wind.rain.sun1 for Trombone and Tape (1990)
 Luca Francesconi, Animus for Trombone and Live Electronics (1995-96)
 Rolf Gehlhaar, Rondell for Trombone and Delay (1975)
 Vinko Globokar, Prestop II for Trombone and Electronics (1991)
 Jonathan Harvey, Ricercare una melodia for Trombone and Electronics (1984)
 Alvin Lucier, Wind Shadows for Trombone and Pure Wave Oscillators (1994)
 Octavian Nemescu, IN PAR for Trombone and Tape (1988)
 Phill Niblock, A Trombone Piece for Taped Trombone (1977)
 Phill Niblock, A Third Trombone for Taped Trombone (1979)
 Pauline Oliveros, Theater Piece for Trombone Player for Trombone, Pipes and Tape (1966)
 Pauline Oliveros, The Heart of Tones for Trombone and Electronics (1999)
 Pauline Oliveros, Red Shifts for Trombone, Oscillators and Noise (2000)
 Pauline Oliveros, Big Room for Trombone and Expanded Instrument System (2003)
 Wolfgang von Schweinitz, JUZ (a Yodel Cry), Op. 40 for Trombone and Echo Sounds (1999/2009)
 Karlheinz Stockhausen, Signale zur Invasion, 2. ex Nr. 61 for Trombone and Electronics (1992)
 Marco Stroppa, I will not kiss your f.ing flag'' for Trombone and Electronics (2005)

References

 
 
 
 

 
Classical music lists